Rochedale may refer to:
 Rochedale Village, Berkeley, California
 Rochedale, Queensland